"Get Up, Stand Up" is a song by house music DJ/producer Laurence Nelson, who recorded the track under the project Phunky Phantom. The track features the repeated use of the only lyrics on the song, "Get up, stand up, strut your funky stuff sure enough", which was sampled from a 1979 disco song called "Strut Your Funky Stuff" by the American group Frantique. This was Nelson's only song to make the Hot Dance Club Play chart, reaching number one on October 11, 1997. The same track reached number 27 in the UK Singles Chart in May 1998.

Track listings
 12 in. vinyl (US)
A1 Get Up Stand Up (Original Mix)  6:56  
A2 Get Up Stand Up (KLM Vocal Mix) 9:27  
B1 Get Up Stand Up (Tin Tin Out Dub) 7:49  
B2 Get Up Stand Up (KLM Dub Mix) 9:28

 CD Maxi (UK)
 Get Up Stand Up (KLM Vocal Edit) 3:51  
 Get Up Stand Up (Original Mix)  6:58  
 Get Up Stand Up (Tin Tin Out Dub) 7:52  
 Get Up Stand Up (KLM Vocal Mix) 9:35  
 Get Up Stand Up (KLM Dub Mix) 9:28

 CD Maxi (Australia)
 Get Up Stand Up (Radio Edit)  3:10  
 Get Up Stand Up (KLM Vocal Mix) 9:28  
 Get Up Stand Up (Tin Tin Out Dub) 7:49  
 Get Up Stand Up (Tony De Vit Mix) 8:57  
 Get Up Stand Up (Super Ego Mix) 6:14

See also 
 List of number-one dance singles of 1997 (U.S.)

References

External links
KLM Vocal Mix of "Get Up, Stand Up" at YouTube

1997 songs
1997 singles
Electronica songs
American house music songs